is a Japanese rock band from Nagano Prefecture, consisting of vocalist and rhythm guitarist Remi Matsuo and lead guitarist Hiroki Kamemoto. Originally formed by Matsuo as a quartet for a high school festival in 2007, the group became a duo when they moved to Tokyo to pursue music professionally in February 2010. Glim Spanky signed to Virgin Music in 2014, and released their first full-length album, Sunrise Journey, the following year. They have since released six studio albums, with 2017's Bizarre Carnival being their highest-charting to date.

Their retro sound, reminiscent of 1960s and 1970s rock bands, has received praise from musicians such as Keisuke Kuwata, Motoharu Sano, and Maki Nomiya. In addition to releasing material as Glim Spanky, Matsuo and Kamemoto frequently collaborate with and write songs for other artists.

History

Early years and debut (2007–2015)
Glim Spanky was formed in Nagano Prefecture by Remi Matsuo during her first year of high school to perform a cover of Bump of Chicken's "Arue" at Matsukawa High School's 2007 cultural festival. With the exception of the drummer, each member was a beginner musician. The band's name comes from Matsuo's interest in Celtic culture and fantasy literature; she read a book describing a goblin's "glim" and added "spank" to describe their aggressive drive towards the music industry. The guitarist and bassist quit after the festival, but Matsuo wanted to play another live in a week and recruited an upperclassman to play bass as a three-piece. Eventually, the bassist assumed it was difficult for Matsuo to play all of the guitar by herself and recruited another guitarist into the band without her permission; Hiroki Kamemoto, another upperclassman, worked at the same part-time job as the bassist and joined the band. They then began writing their own material and started focusing on the band full time. On days off from school, they would practice from 8:00 in the morning, until 1:00am at night. Glim Spanky won the Rock Banchō held by Sony Music in December 2008 and were finalists at the 2009 teenage artists-only festival Senko Riot held by Sony, Tokyo FM and au.

By 2009, Kamemoto was enrolled in Nagoya University, but traveled back to Nagano once a week for band activities. When their bassist and drummer quit in February 2010, Matsuo decided to enroll in Nihon University's art department and Kamemoto transferred to the closer Saitama University so they could continue the band in Tokyo. They resumed activities with support musicians in April 2010. Glim Spanky had their first release in December 2013 when Space Shower Music released the mini-album Music Freak nationwide. They went on their Freak on the Hill tour in March 2014. Matsuo stated that their first four years playing live houses in Tokyo as a duo were difficult, but because they were particular about their sound, stage presence, costumes and artwork, she was confident that the music industry would not leave behind a band with such a complete package. They had received offers from various offices, but waited until they found the right one.

In June 2014 the band released their second mini-album and their major label debut, Shōsō, via EMI R (later renamed Virgin Music). It includes covers of "Rolling in the Deep" by Adele and "Hikōkigumo" by Yumi Arai. They supported it with the Hello Freaks Tour, which ended with the group's first one-man live. After Matsuo provided vocals to a cover of Janis Joplin's "Move Over" for a Suzuki commercial, Glim Spanky recorded their own version and released it as a 7-inch vinyl record limited to 300 copies on November 28. That year, Matsuo contributed guest vocals to the song "Nightfever" by Analogfish.

Glim Spanky's first single, "Homero yo", was released in February 2015 and was used as the theme song of the TV show Taiko Mochi no Tatsujin ~Tadashii no Home-kata~. The band released a limited vinyl single for their song "Otona ni Nattara" in May 2015, which was used as the theme song of the film Children of Iron. In July 2015, they released their next single, "Real Onigokko", written as the theme song for the movie of the same name, and performed at that year's Fuji Rock Festival on the Red Marquee stage. Their first full-length album Sunrise Journey was produced by Junji Ishiwatari and Seiji Kameda, and released in July 2015. It also includes "Wonder Alone", the ending theme of the Himitsu Kessha Taka no Tsume DO anime, for which Matsuo and Kamemoto voiced characters based on themselves. Glim Spanky performed a one-man concert at Akasaka Blitz in October, and they were one of the recipients of that year's Miura Jun Award and nominated for Next Break Artist at the 2015 MTV Video Music Awards Japan.

Bizarre Carnival and Looking for the Magic (2016–2019)
After their third mini-album Wild Side wo Ike in January 2016, Glim Spanky contributed a cover of "Sgt. Pepper's Lonely Hearts Club Band" for Hello Goodbye, a tribute album to The Beatles. Their second album Next One followed on July 20 and its tour began in September. "Ikari o Kure yo" was used as the theme song for One Piece Film: Gold, "Hanashi o Shiyō" is the second ending theme of Kyōkai no Rinne, while "Yami ni me o Koraseba" is the theme song of the film Shōjo. I Stand Alone, their fourth mini-album, was released on April 12, 2017. Their third album Bizarre Carnival was released on September 13, 2017, and the band embarked on its tour in October. They played their first overseas concert in Shanghai on December 16 and another in Taiwan on January 20, 2018. Bizarre Carnival was nominated for the 2018 CD Shop Awards.

The duo's third single, "Orokamono-tachi", was released on January 31 and is the theme song of the Funōhan live-action film adaptation. It includes a cover of Carole King's "I Feel the Earth Move". They also wrote the song "The Flowers" for the Isetan Mitsukoshi Holdings film 2018 Hanabanasai Wild Flowers ~Hana o Aisuru Hitobito. In a collaboration for the project, the band performed a concert on top of a building in Shinjuku on February 25 which was broadcast live. "The Flowers" is included as a b-side on their fourth single "All of Us", released on May 9. If ordered on certain websites, the single includes their cover of The Brilliant Green's "There Will Be Love There (Ai no Aru Basho)" from the February 17, 2018 episode of the BS-TBS TV show Sound Inn "S". Glim Spanky performed at the Nippon Budokan for the first time on May 12. They also performed at Makuhari Messe on June 23 as part of Luna Sea's Lunatic Fest. 2018, where they were joined onstage by Sugizo for "Orokamono-tachi", and on June 30 as part of SiM's Dead Pop Festival 2018. The band returned to Fuji Rock Festival on July 27, this time playing the main stage, and played the Rock in Japan Festival on August 12.

Glim Spanky were nominated for Best Japan Act at the 2018 MTV Europe Music Awards. They released their fourth album Looking for the Magic on November 21 and began its tour in March 2019, which continued into June and included shows in Taiwan and Hong Kong. The song "TV Show" was recorded in Los Angeles and features Jack White support members Jack Lawrence and Carla Azar on bass and drums respectively. Glim Spanky collaborated with Sugizo again to cover Daisuke Inoue's "Meguriai" as the first ending theme of Mobile Suit Gundam: The Origin - Advent of the Red Comet. The duo also provided Momoiro Clover Z with the song "Lady May", which they both composed the music for, while Matsuo wrote the lyrics and Kamemoto arranged it and contributed guitar. Glim Spanky returned yet again to Fuji Rock Festival where they performed twice; once on July 26 as part of Route 17 Rock'n'Roll Orchestra, a session band also including Yūzō Kayama, Reichi Nakaido, Liam Ó Maonlaí and Shō Okamoto (Okamoto's), and then an acoustic set on 27. They also performed at Rock in Japan Festival on August 11 and the Rising Sun Rock Festival on August 17.

Walking on Fire (2019–present)
Glim Spanky contributed the track "Circle of Time" to October 2019's New Gene, Inspired from Phoenix, a compilation album featuring songs inspired by Osamu Tezuka's manga series Phoenix. The band's fifth single "Story no Saki ni", which was written to be the theme song of the TV show Re:Follower, was released on November 20, 2019. Its music video features the deepfake technique, utilizing the faces of six other women, to express multiple personality disorder on its lead actress. Glim Spanky wrote the song "From the Seeds" for Mone Kamishiraishi to sing as the opening theme for the March 2020 second season of the 7 Seeds anime. Both members composed the music, Matsuo wrote the lyrics and participated in the chorus, and Kamemoto arranged the song and provided guitar. On June 24, 2020, the band released the song "Konna Yofuke wa" digitally after writing and recording it remotely due to the COVID-19 pandemic in Japan. In October, they released their fifth album Walking on Fire and were recipients of the Shinmai Senshō award as natives of Nagano Prefecture who made important contributions to society. Glim Spanky live streamed a concert on November 14. The duo collaborated with Tomoyasu Hotei for the song "Savage Sun" on his November 2020 album Soul to Soul, and wrote "Mikansei na Drama" for DISH; both members composed the music, while Matsuo wrote the lyrics, and Kamemoto arranged the song and provided guitar. Kamemoto also provided guitar to the theme songs of the 2020 anime film Earwig and the Witch. For the film's 2022 album Āya to Majo Songbook 13 Lime Avenue, which is credited to the fictional band "Earwig", Kamemoto played on every track and Glim Spanky contributed the songs "The House in Lime Avenue" and "A Black Cat".

Glim Spanky's song "Kaze wa Yonde Iru" was selected to be the official theme of Asahi Broadcasting Nagano's 30th anniversary, and was later released digitally in June 2021 with their own version of "Mikansei na Drama". They worked with Kamishiraishi again on covers of "Aozora" by The Blue Hearts and "Ikareta Baby" by Fishmans for her June album Ano Uta -2-. The duo covered "Slow na Boogie ni Shite Kure (I Want You)" for July's Takashi Matsumoto tribute album Take Me to Kazemachi!. In September 2021, they digitally released a cover of UA's 1996 song "Jounetsu". Glim Spanky wrote the song "Kagami yo Kagami" for virtual singer KAF, while Matsuo wrote and produced the song "Candy Moon" for Maki Nomiya. The band's sixth studio album, Into the Time Hole, was released on August 3, 2022. It was supported by an 11-date nationwide tour from November 2 to December 21. Glim Spanky's "Fukō Are" is the theme song of the Sawako ~ Soreha, Hatenaki Fukushū TV drama. Its lyrics were co-written by Junji Ishiwatari.

Music and influences
Glim Spanky's music is largely influenced by Western rock and blues bands from the 1960s and 1970s. The duo are also influenced by the fashion from those two decades and usually wear retro-looking clothing. They have also included liquid light shows, which were popularized in the 1960s, at their concerts. Matsuo is the principal songwriter of the band's lyrics and music, but when she only has a guitar riff, chord progression or drum phrase before working with Kamemoto to turn it into a song, then both get credited for the music as Glim Spanky. Her husky vocals have been likened to those of Janis Joplin.

Due to her unique voice, Matsuo struggled with singing in primary school and junior high. But after noticing that John Lennon's voice had a rough quality to it in songs such as "Help!", she realized that her voice would suit rock music well. She cited The Beatles, The Who, Led Zeppelin, Jimi Hendrix and Joni Mitchell as influences. Matsuo grew up in an artistic family and was exposed to a wide range of music and cultures by meeting musicians and poets. In addition to the ubiquitous Western bands, she also heard French music, African rock, Shibuya-kei and folk. Kamemoto started playing guitar because of Glay, then moved on to Nirvana, Guns N' Roses, Oasis, Jimi Hendrix and Cream. The duo are also fans of Japanese bands such as Bump of Chicken, Asian Kung-Fu Generation and Ellegarden which they grew up listening to. Both members cited The Beatles as their biggest influence.

Talking about their second album Next One in 2016, Matsuo said that it is "absurd" to try and put Japanese lyrics in Western-style rock music. "But even so, you have to, so although Japanese lyrics are included on top of the melody, if you were to remove them you would have a completely Western-style melody, so we made the album that that in mind." In regards to what the band wanted to do next, she said that because rock music is imported from the West, she pondered what type of rock people in the West can not make, and came up with "orientalness." Western artists became influenced by Indian music and created psychedelic rock, but "Luckily for us, we already have that orientalness the moment we are born. We can put out there something people in the West cannot, so we are establishing ourselves a Japanese kind of rock that will echo throughout the world[...] A genuine oriental psychedelic rock band."

Speaking of their 2017 album Bizarre Carnival, the singer described their first and second albums as "business cards to introduce ourselves. Up until now, we've held off on the kind of maniacal rock music we really like." 2018's Looking for the Magic begins with distorted vocals as Matsuo wanted the listener to be unable to tell where the singer was from in order "to create a utopia-like song that gradually enthralls listeners." The band found recording in Los Angeles quite different than in Japan, where its done in completely soundproof rooms with expensive cables. For "TV Show" they purposely left the white noise in to give it a raw feel. Matsuo referred to the song as a wake up call against people believing fake news on the internet; "Now that's scary. I wanted to say [in this song] that people should think for themselves about what is true, without just being fed information." She further stated "I've always included hope into even my most judgmental songs, because I believe rock music is about hope."

Members
  – vocals, rhythm guitar (2007–present)
  – lead guitar, backing vocals (2007–present)

Support members
  – bass
  – drums
  – drums
  – drums
  – keyboards, backing vocals
  – keyboards, backing vocals
  – guitar

Former members
  – bass (2007–2010)
  – drums (2007–2010)

Discography

Albums

Mini-albums

Singles

Other releases

Compilation appearances

Awards

References

External links
 
  for Deezer

Japanese psychedelic rock music groups
Japanese garage rock groups
Blues rock groups
Japanese musical duos
Musical groups from Nagano Prefecture
Musical groups established in 2007
2007 establishments in Japan
Female-fronted musical groups
Male–female musical duos